A family of choice, also known as chosen family, found family, kith and kin, or hānai family is a term that refers to a non-biologically related group of people established to provide ongoing social support. Unlike a "family of origin" (the biological family or that in which one is raised), a family of choice is based on chosen bonds, not biological ones. Families of choice are common within the LGBT community, groups of veterans, supportive communities overcoming addiction or childhood abuse, and friend groups who have little to no contact with their biological parents. It refers to the group of people in an individual's life that satisfies the typical role of family as a support system.

Family of choice in the LGBT community
LGBT individuals in particular often seek out families of choice when ostracization by their families of origin leave them in need of social support. Kath Weston noted that in 1991, by coming out to their family of origin, an LGBT individual almost always runs some risk of being disowned. Many LGBT individuals, upon coming out, face rejection or shame from the families they were raised in. Some research indicates that in the absence of social support by an individual’s family of origin, a family of choice can promote resilience.

See also

References

Social concepts